Vend is cloud-based point-of-sale and retail management software company based in Auckland, New Zealand. The company was founded in 2010 by Vaughan Rowsell. It was acquired by Australian software company Kounta.

History 
Vend was launched in August 2010 by software developer Vaughan Rowsell.

In 2013, Vend raised NZ $8 million of funding from investors in Australia and New Zealand. Further capital has also been raised from existing investors including Point Nine Capital in Berlin. The following year, Vend closed US $20 million (NZ $25 million) in Series B funding. The funding round was co-lead by Peter Thiel and Square Peg Capital in Australia. Later in 2014, the company also opened offices in Toronto and London. In August 2015, Vend announced that it had raised NZ $12 million, mainly from existing investors along with new entrant Punakaiki Fund. The company also announced cuts to staff.

In 2015, Vend launched Vend Ecommerce. It also announced a partnership with UK payments provider iZettle, and North American payments provider Mercury (now Vantiv).

In 2016, the company partnered with Square to enable retailers who use Vend's software to process payments with Square.

In 2016 Vend also launched an app for inventory management named Counter.

At the end of 2016, Vend raised a further US $9 million (NZ $13 million) led by existing investors, and with significant new investment from fund manager Movac. In 2016 Vend grew its UK staff to 20 and opened a new office in East London.

In 2017, Vend renamed its inventory app Counter to Scanner by Vend.

On 12 March 2021, Vend was sold to Lightspeed POS Inc. for US $350 million (NZ $455 million).

Features 
Vend's services include web-based POS software, inventory management, E-commerce, customer loyalty, and reporting analytics. Vend integrates with other business and payments applications including Shopify, Square, Xero and PayPal.

Vend's software allows merchants to generate reports on sales, inventory, and customer behavior. Vend Ecommerce and integrations with partners like Shopify and WooCommerce enable retailers to sell online.

Along with its software, Vend provides content and advice for retailers via a blog. The blog has been listed as a resource by various industry sites.

Technology 
Vend uses HTML5 features in Google Chrome and Safari to implement offline processing capabilities.

 A webSQL database built into the browser provides local inventory storage so sales can be processed offline and all stock levels updated.
 HTML5’s offline manifest tells the browser to take copies of certain files and pages for offline use.
 WebSocket (another element of HTML5) allows Vend to talk to other devices on a local network, interfacing with hardware such as an EFTPOS unit or other payment devices.
Aside from being compatible with mobile browsers, Vend also has an iOS app called Vend Register.

Awards and recognition 
 2011 NZ Innovators Awards – ICT category and Supreme Award 
 2014 NZ Hi-Tech Awards – IBM Hi-Tech Exporter of the Year (under $5 million revenue) and Cisco Hi-Tech Emerging Company of the Year categories 
 2014 Gold Stevie Award for Vend's homepage video (American Business Awards) 
 2014 Monocle Magazines's Top 25 in Retail 
 2015 Gold Stevie Award for Customer Service (American Business Awards) 
 2015 Silver Stevie Award for Vend's video with TopShelf Style (American Business Awards)
 2015 Deloitte NZ Fast50 – 7th fastest growing company in NZ 
 2015 Industry Specific App of the Year – Xero UK 
 2016 Deloitte NZ Fast50 – 38th fastest growing company in NZ 
 2016 TIN100 Hot Emerging Companies New Zealand (2nd)
 2017 Vend named as the best all-in-one POS system for small businesses by Business News Daily
2019 Newsweek Best Business Tools – POS

References 

Software companies of New Zealand
Point of sale companies
Software companies established in 2010
New Zealand companies established in 2010